The 2023 Volta a la Comunitat Valenciana (English: Tour of the Valencian Community) was a road cycling stage race that took place from 1 to 5 February 2023 in the Spanish autonomous community of Valencia. The race was rated as a category 2.Pro event on the 2023 UCI ProSeries calendars, and was the 73rd edition of the Volta a la Comunitat Valenciana.

Teams 
Ten of the 18 UCI WorldTeams and nine UCI ProTeams made up the 19 teams that took part in the race. All but one team entered a full squad of seven riders;  only entered five riders. In total, 130 riders started the race, as Mikkel Bjerg of  did not start the first stage.

UCI WorldTeams

 
 
 
 
 
 
 
 
 
 

UCI ProTeams

Route

Stages

Stage 1 
1 February 2022 — Orihuela to Altea,

Stage 2 
2 February 2022 — Novelda to Alto del Pino,

Stage 3 
3 February 2022 — Bétera to Sagonte,

Stage 4 
4 February 2022 — Burriana to Alto de la Cueva Santa,

Stage 5 
5 February 2022 — Paterna to Valencia,

Classification leadership table 

 On stage 2, Olav Kooij, who was second in the points classification, wore the orange jersey, because first-placed Biniam Girmay wore the yellow jersey as the leader of the general classification. For the same reason, Samuele Battistella, who was third in the young rider classification behind Girmay and Kooij, wore the white jersey.

Current classification standings

General classification

Points classification

Mountains classification

Young rider classification

Team classification

References

External links 
 

2023
2023 UCI Europe Tour
2023 UCI ProSeries
2023 in Spanish road cycling
February 2023 sports events in Spain